Kilconway is a barony in County Antrim, Northern Ireland. It is bordered by six other baronies: Dunluce Upper to the north; Glenarm Lower to the east; Antrim Lower to the south-east; Toome Lower to the south; Loughinsholin to the south-west; and Coleraine to the north-east. Kilconway also formed part of the medieval territory known as the Route. Springmount Bog is located within the barony.

History

List of settlements
Below is a list of settlements in Kilconway:

Villages
Cargan
Cloughmills
Dunloy
Rasharkin

Population centres
Clogh
Finvoy
Glarryford
Glenravel
Killagan
Loughguile (part in barony of Dunluce Upper)
Newtown Crommelin

List of civil parishes
Below is a list of civil parishes in Kilconway:
Ballymoney (also partly in barony of Dunluce Upper, County Antrim and North East Liberties of Coleraine, County Londonderry)
Craigs (split with barony of Toome Lower)
Dunaghy
Finvoy
Grange of Dundermot
Killagan (split with barony of Dunluce Upper)
Loughguille (split with barony of Dunluce Upper)
Rasharkin
Newtown Crommelin

References